Chaiyaphum Province Stadium is a multi-purpose stadium in Chaiyaphum Province, Thailand. It is currently used mostly for football matches and is the home stadium of Chaiyaphum United F.C. The stadium holds 2,564 people.

Football venues in Thailand
Multi-purpose stadiums in Thailand
Buildings and structures in Chaiyaphum province
Sport in Chaiyaphum province